The Albuquerque City Council is the elected legislative authority of the city of Albuquerque, New Mexico. It consists of nine members, elected from respective districts of the city on a non-partisan basis. The form of city government is mayor–council government and home rule municipality. It meets in the Vincent A. Griego Chambers at the Albuquerque City Hall in Downtown Albuquerque.

History

From 1916 to 1974, Albuquerque was governed by a city commission of at-large members. In the place of a president in the council, the mayor was known as the "Chairman of the Commission." In 1975, due to large growth in the city, voters replaced the commission system with a city council system.

Composition

The council is composed of nine members in nine districts, each elected by their individual district residents to a four-year term. The chairman of the council is elected by members of the council on a yearly basis, in votes the chairman is likely chosen by the majority party in control of the city council. Since 1975, there have been no "at-large" members, elections are non-partisan, but party registration is often mentioned through local media outlets and the respective parties usually endorse their candidates.

Current members

Political party strength and past composition

References

External links

City Council
New Mexico city councils
Organizations based in Albuquerque, New Mexico
1975 establishments in New Mexico
Government agencies established in 1975